The Cíes Islands are an archipelago off the coast of Pontevedra in Galicia, Spain, in the mouth of the Ria de Vigo. They were declared a Nature Reserve in 1980 and are included in the Atlantic Islands of Galicia National Park (Parque Nacional Marítimo-Terrestre das Illas Atlánticas de Galicia) created in 2002.

The archipelago

The Cíes consist of three islands, Monteagudo ("Sharp Mount" or North Island), do Faro ("Lighthouse Island", or Illa do Medio, "Middle Island") and San Martiño ("Saint Martin" or South Island).

Monteagudo is separated from the Morrazo peninsula by the North Canal while San Martiño is separated from the coast of Santoulo cape (mount Ferro) by the Freu da Porta Strait. During high tide the sea flows between the islands in the western side and, blocked by the beach it fills the lagoon between the sandy area and the rocks. The highest peak is the Alto das Cíes in Monteagudo.

The islands formed by the end of the Tertiary, when some parts of the coast sank, creating the rías ("estuaries"). All three islands are the peaks of the coastal mountains now partially under the sea and are formed mainly of granitic rock.

The eastern side is less steep, covered by woods and bushes and protected from the Atlantic winds, allowing the formation of beaches and dunes.

Atlantic squalls pass over the islands, unloading as they collide with the coast. Therefore, the Cíes receive more or less half of the rain than the rest of the Rías Baixas.

Nature reserve
Due to the high natural value of this area and to the deterioration it was suffering by human activity, it was declared a Nature Reserve in 1980. The level of legal protection varied until November 21, 2000, when the Galician Parliament unanimously agreed to apply for the status of National Park to the central Government.

The marine part of the Park is measured as a 100-meter-wide strip from the shore in low tide. Since 1992, underwater fishing is forbidden in the islands. National Parks are nature areas nearly untransformed by human activity that, based on their landscape, geological or ecosystems possess aesthetic, ecologic, educative or scientific values worth of special protection. Therefore, the activities that alter or endanger the stability of the ecosystem are forbidden. Some traditional activities (like traditional fishing) are allowed as long as they are compatible with the environment and the preservation of natural resources.

Since 1988, the Islands have a status of ZEPA (Zona de Especial Protección para las Aves, Spanish for Special Protection Area for Birds), and they are included in the Natura 2000 network, which develops European Union Directives in relation to habitats and birds.
It contains one of the main colonies of the yellow-legged gull.
The ZEPAs are protected mainly to avoid pollution and general deterioration of the places used by birds permanently or during their migrations.

Tourism

In summer, boats link Monteagudo with the ports of Vigo, Baiona and Cangas.
There is a camping area but permissions have to be reserved at the Vigo port.
A supermarket, a visitor center and a restaurant cater for visitors.
There are no waste bins on the islands.
Visitors are required to take their litter back to the mainland. The Cíes Islands are composed of nine  beaches with fine white sand and clear waters. In February 2007 the British newspaper The Guardian chose the beach of Rodas, on the island of Monteagudo, as "the best beach in the world." "Galegos come here to spend long, lazy summer days on the Praia das Rodas, a perfect crescent of soft, pale sand backed by small dunes sheltering a calm lagoon of crystal-clear sea", says the magazine. In 2022, the island was chosen by the New York Times, as one of the 52 Places for a Changed World, due to its efforts "to protect its environment and guard against overtourism".

Flora
The scrubland is formed mainly of autochthonous species, like gorse, broom, asparagus, spurge flax (Thymelaea) or rockrose (Cistaceae).

The woodland has suffered bigger alterations, since most endemic species like the common fig or the pyrenaean oak (Quercus pyrenaica) are now reduced to symbolic representation by the reforestation of nearly one fourth of the surface with pine trees and eucalyptus. On the other hand, the strong winds with a high content in salt act as barrier in the development of the trees.

Some rare and representative coastal species do grow in the dunes, beaches and cliffs under very extreme climatic conditions, as the sea pink (Armeria pungens; in galician herba de namorar or "love plant"), locally endangered, and an important number of camariñas (galician common name for Corema album), an endemic species from the Iberian Peninsula western coast.
Typically marshland flora (like rushes) grow in the area of the lagoon.

Fauna
There is a large colony of seagulls, about 22,000 pairs, and they are the dominant species in Cíes. A census in 1960 counted 400 pairs of Iberian guillemots (Uria aalge albionis), a species now almost extinct on the islands. Other species include birds of prey, pigeons, petrels, pelicans, doves, woodpeckers and other types of bird, which nest in trees and cliffs. Also, there are a variety of birds wintering or resting on their migratory journeys here. In the Alto da Campa (Illa do Faro) and in the Faro do Peito (San Martiño), there are ornithological observatories. The waters around the islands are rich in biodiversity, attracting whales, dolphins, and sharks including blue sharks and basking sharks.

Life and seabed 
The underwater area surrounding the Cíes forms one of the richest ecosystems on the Galician coast. The most remarkable thing is an important forest of brown algae.

The perimeter of the islands has different types of environments: the cliffs, exposed to strong waves, are populated by barnacles and mussels. In its underwater part, very rocky, you can find crabs, spider crabs, lobsters and octopuses. On the beaches of the most protected areas there are many bivalve molluscs, as well as turbot, plaice and sole. The rocky but protected areas of the interior of the islands are populated by true forests of anemones and numerous sea urchins.

The waters surrounding the Cíes are usually visited by dolphins, whales and sea turtles.

The water circulation system that enters and leaves the Galician estuaries and the mixture of fresh and salt water favor the concentration of nutrients and microorganisms that are a source of food for the rest of the marine species.

Archaeological remains can also be observed on these seabeds.

References

Archipelagoes of the Atlantic Ocean
Archipelagoes of Spain
National parks of Spain
Special Protection Areas of Spain
Landforms of Galicia (Spain)
Protected areas of Galicia (Spain)